

Alaparma was an Italian aircraft manufacturer of the immediate post-World War II period. It was founded in 1945 by designer Capt Adriano Mantelli and Livio Agostini to produce an unusual light aircraft developed by Mantelli during the war, initially as the Tucano and later as the Baldo.

See also

 List of Italian companies

References
 
 

Defunct aircraft manufacturers of Italy